The Struggle Everlasting is a 1918 American silent allegorical drama film directed by James Kirkwood, Sr. and starring stage star Florence Reed. It is based on a 1907 play, The Struggle Everlasting, by Edward Milton Royle.

Cast

Florence Reed as Body, aka Lois
Milton Sills as Mind, aka Bruce
Irving Cummings as Soul, aka Dean
Wellington Playter as Champion Pugilist, aka Bob Dempsey
E. J. Ratcliffe as A Banker
Edwin N. Hoyt as Worldly Wise, aka Dr. Brandt
Fred C. Jones as Musician, aka Pierre Viron
Albert Hall as Class Poet
Richard Hattera as Aristocrat, aka Ned Coign
Margaret Pitt as A Wife
Mildred Cheshire as Frail Sister
George Cooper as Slimy Thing

Reception

The film industry created the National Association of the Motion Picture Industry (NAMPI) in 1916 in an effort to preempt censorship by states and municipalities, and it used a list of subjects called the "Thirteen Points" which film plots were to avoid. The Struggle Everlasting, with its white slavery plot line, is an example of a film that clearly violated the Thirteen Points and yet was still distributed. Since the NAMPI was ineffective, it was replaced in 1922.

Like many American films of the time, The Struggle Everlasting was also subject to restrictions and cuts by city and state film censorship boards. For example, the Chicago Board of Censors cut, in Reel 1, the scene of woman apparently nude to include all scenes of bather up to point where she puts a garb over herself, Reel 4, closeup of women in one-piece bathing suits at pool, and, Reel 6, vision showing woman soliciting.

Preservation
With no copies of The Struggle Everlasting listed as being held in any film archives, it is a lost film.

References

External links

 

1918 films
American silent feature films
American films based on plays
Films directed by James Kirkwood Sr.
Lost American films
American black-and-white films
Silent American drama films
1918 drama films
1918 lost films
Lost drama films
Arrow Film Corporation films
1910s American films